This is a list of mobile network operators of the Middle East and Africa.

Algeria
In Q2 of 2021, the penetration rate was estimated at 104.13% over a population estimate of 44.02 million.

The telecom regulator in Algeria is Autorité de Régulation de la Poste et des Télécommunications (ARPT).

Angola
In September 2010 the penetration rate was estimated at 63.7% over a population estimate of 13.3 million.

The telecom regulator in Angola is Instituto Angolano das Comunicações (INACOM).

Bahrain
At the end of 2011 the penetration rate was estimated at 133% over a population estimate of 1.27 million.

The telecom regulator in Bahrain is Telecommunications Regulatory Authority of Bahrain (TRA).

Benin
In December 2015, the penetration rate was estimated at 90.33% (in 2014, the population was estimated as 10.33 millions).

The telecom regulator in Benin is Autorité de régulation des communications électroniques et de la poste (ARCEP BENIN).

Botswana

In March 2015 the penetration rate was 167% over a population estimate of 2.05 millions.

The telecom regulator in Botswana is Botswana Communications Regulatory Authority (BOCRA).

Burkina Faso
In December 2011 the penetration rate was estimated at 36% over a population estimate of 16.7 million.

The telecom regulator in Burkina Faso is Autorité de régulation des communications électroniques et des postes (ARCEP), the current name of the former Autorité de régulation des communications électroniques (ARCE) and of the previous Autorité de régulation des télécommunications (ARTEL).

Burundi
In 2011 the penetration rate was estimated at 20% over a population estimate of 8 million.

The telecom regulator in Burundi is Agence de Régulation et de Contrôle des Télécommunications (ARCT).

Cabo Verde
In September 2010 the penetration rate was estimated at 87.5% over a population estimate of 0.5 million.

The telecom regulator in Cabo Verde is Agência Nacional de Comunicações (ANAC).

Cameroon
In July 2011 the penetration rate was estimated at 43% over a population estimate of 19.7 million.

The telecom regulator in Cameroon is Agence de Régulation des Télécommunications (ART).

Central African Republic
In September 2010 the penetration rate was estimated at 17.2% over a population estimate of 4.9 million.

The telecom regulator in Central African Republic is Agence de régulation des télécommunications (ART).

Chad
In September 2010 the penetration rate was estimated at 24.3% over a population estimate of 10.7 million.

The telecom regulator in Chad is Office Tchadien de Régulation des Télécommunications (OTRT).

Comoros
In September 2010 the penetration rate was estimated at 20.8% over a population estimate of 0.8 million.

The telecom regulator in Comoros is Autorité Nationale de Régulation des TIC (ANRTIC).

Congo
In Q4 2015 the penetration rate was estimated at 95.7% over a population estimate of 4.6 million.

The telecom regulator in Congo is Agence de Régulation des postes et des Communications Electroniques (ARPCE).

Côte d'Ivoire
In September 2010 the penetration rate was estimated at 68.5% over a population estimate of 21.5 million.

The telecom regulator in Côte d'Ivoire is Autorité de Régulation des Télécommunications/TIC de Côte d'Ivoire (ARTCI).

Democratic Republic of the Congo
In 2016 the penetration rate was estimated at 50% over a population estimate of 80 million.

The telecom regulator in Democratic Republic of the Congo is Agence de Régulation de la Poste et des Télécommunications du Congo (ARPTC).

Djibouti
In September 2010 the penetration rate was estimated at 14.88% over a population estimate of 0.75 million.

The telecom regulator in Djibouti is Ministère de la Communication chargé des Postes et des Télécommunications (MCPT).

Egypt
Egypt has 99 million mobile users as of December 2017, government figures showed.

The telecom regulator in Egypt is National Telecom Regulatory Authority (NTRA).

Equatorial Guinea
In September 2010 the penetration rate was estimated at 74% over a population estimate of 0.6 million.

The telecom regulator in Equatorial Guinea is Órgano Regulador de las Telecomunicaciones Telecommunications Regulatory Agency (ORTEL).

Eritrea
In September 2010 the penetration rate was estimated at 3.4% over a population estimate of 5.9 million.

The telecom regulator in Eritrea is Eritrean Communications Regulatory Authority (ECRA).

Ethiopia
In September 2010 the penetration rate was estimated at 4.6% over a population estimate of 90.8 million.

The telecom regulator in Ethiopia is Ministry of Communication and Information Technology (MCIT).

Gabon
In June 2018 the penetration rate was estimated to at almost 157%.

The telecom regulator in Gabon is Autorité de Régulation des communications Electroniques et des Postes (ARCEP) https://www.arcep.ga.

Gambia
In 2010 the penetration rate was estimated at 85.53% over a population estimate of 1.77 million.

The telecom regulator in Gambia is Public Utilities Regulatory Authority (PURA).

Ghana
In March 2021 the penetration rate was estimated at 133.14% over a population estimate of 31.1 million.

The telecom regulator in Ghana is National Communications Authority (NCA).

Guinea
In Q4 2015, the penetration rate was estimated at 99.1% over a population estimate of 10.8 million.

The telecom regulator in Guinea is Autorité de Régulation des Postes et Télécommunications (ARPT).

Guinea-Bissau
In March 2015 the penetration rate was estimated at 67.0% over a population estimate of 1.75 million.

The telecom regulator in Guinea-Bissau is Autoridade Reguladora Nacional das Tecnologias de Informação e Comunicação da Guiné Bissau (ARN).

Iran
In December 2020 the penetration rate was estimated at 151.91% over a population estimate of 80 million.

The telecom regulator in Iran is Communications Regulatory Authority of Iran سازمان تنظيم مقررات و ارتباطات رادیویی (CRA).

Iraq
In September 2010 the penetration rate was estimated at 74.2% over a population estimate of 30.4 million.

The telecom regulator in Iraq is Communications and Media Commission هيئة الإعلام والإتصالات (CMC).

Israel
In 2018 the penetration rate was estimated at 111% over a population estimate of over 10 million.

The telecom regulator in Israel is Ministry of Communications משרד התקשורת (MOC).

Jordan
In March 2016 the penetration rate was estimated at 140% over a population estimate of 14.09 million.

The telecom regulator in Jordan is Telecommunications Regulatory Commission هيئة تنظيم قطاع الاتصالات (TRC).

Kenya

The country has 40.8 million subscribers in total, or a 76.9% penetration rate. (Jan 2018)

The telecom regulator in Kenya is Communications Authority of Kenya (CAK).

Kuwait
In September 2010 the penetration rate was estimated at 164.7% over a population estimate of 2.6 million.

The telecom regulator in Kuwait is the Communication and Information Technology Regulatory Authority (CITRA).

Lebanon
In September 2010 the penetration rate was estimated at 65.9% over a population estimate of 4.1 million.

The telecom regulator in Lebanon is Telecommunications Regulatory Authority (TRA).

Lesotho
In 2016 the penetration rate was estimated at 86% over a population estimate of 2.2 million.

The telecom regulator in Lesotho is Lesotho Communications Authority (LCA).

Liberia
At the end of 2013, the penetration rate was estimated at 68.3% over a population estimate of 3.8 million.

The telecom regulator in Liberia is Liberia Telecommunications Authority (LTA).

Libya
In September 2010 the penetration rate was estimated at 169.74% over a population estimate of 6.6 million.

Madagascar
In 2014 the penetration rate was estimated at 42% (9.7 million) over a population estimate of 23 million.

The telecom regulator in Madagascar is Autorité de Régulation des Technologies de Communication (ARTEC).

Malawi
In September 2010 the penetration rate was estimated at 19.32% over a population estimate of 15.9 million.

The telecom regulator in Malawi is Malawi Communications Regulatory Authority (MACRA).

Mali
The country had 20.2 million subscribers in total (end 2016), or a 113% penetration rate.

The telecom regulator in Mali is Autorité Malienne de Régulation des Télécommunications/TIC et des Postes (AMRTP).

Mauritania
At the end 2020 the penetration rate was estimated at 101% over a population estimate of 4 million.

The telecom regulator in Mauritania is Autorité de Régulation (ARE).

Mauritius
The telecom regulator in Mauritius is Information and Communication Technologies Authority of Mauritius (ICTA).

Morocco
The country has 31.311 million subscribers in total, or a 113.57% penetration rate. (December 2011)

The telecom regulator in Morocco is Agence Nationale de Réglementation des Telecommunications (ANRT).

Mozambique
In September 2010 the penetration rate was estimated at 27.19% over a population estimate of 22.95 million.

The telecom regulator in Mozambique is Instituto Nacional das Comunicações de Moçambique (INCM).

Namibia
In December 2016 Namibia had 2.66 million active SIM cards.

The telecom regulator in Namibia is Communications Regulatory Authority of Namibia (CRAN).

Niger
In September 2010 the penetration rate was estimated at 20.63% over a population estimate of 16.5 million.

The telecom regulator is Autorité de Régulation des Télécommunications et de la Poste (ARTP).

Nigeria
The telecom regulator in Nigeria is Nigerian Communications Commission.

Oman
In September 2010 the penetration rate was estimated at 142.19% over a population estimate of 3 million.

The telecom regulator in Oman is Telecommunications Regulatory Authority هيئة تنظيم الاتصالات (TRA).

Palestine
In September 2010 the penetration rate was estimated at 97.5% over a population estimate of 2.5 million.

The telecom regulator in Palestine is Palestinian Telecommunications Regulatory Authority (PTRA).

Qatar
In September 2010 the penetration rate was estimated at 322.52% over a population estimate of 0.8 million.

The telecom regulator in Qatar is Communications Regulatory Authority (CRA).

La Réunion
This French overseas territory has ? million subscribers in total, or a 74.7% penetration rate. (2008)

The telecom regulator in La Réunion is Autorité de Régulation des Communications Electroniques et des Postes (ARCEP).

Rwanda
In December 2013 the penetration rate was estimated at 63.5% over a population estimate of 11.4 million.

The telecom regulator in Rwanda is Rwanda Utilities Regulatory Agency (RURA).

São Tomé and Príncipe
In September 2010 the penetration rate was estimated at 57.94% over a population estimate of 0.18 million.

The telecom regulator in São Tomé and Príncipe is Autoridade Geral de Regulação (AGER).

Saudi Arabia
In September 2010 the penetration rate was estimated at 162.6% over a population estimate of 26.1 million.

The telecom regulator in Saudi Arabia is Communications and Information Technology Commission هيئة الاتصالات وتقنية المعلومات (CITC).

Senegal
At the end of December 2015 the penetration rate was estimated at 110,74%, over a population estimate of 13,5 millions.

The telecom regulator in Senegal is Autorité de Régulation des Télécommunications et des Postes (ARTP).

Seychelles
In September 2010 the penetration rate was estimated at 245% over a population estimate of 0.09 million.

The telecom regulator in Seychelles is Department of Information Communications Technology (ICT).

Sierra Leone
The country has 0.8 million subscribers in total, or a 13.23% penetration rate. (2007)

The telecom regulator in Sierra Leone is National Telecommunications Commission (NATCOM).

Somalia
As of 2009, dial up internet services in Somalia were among the fastest developing in the region, with an annual landline growth rate of over 12.5%. Internet via satellite also had a steady growth rate of 10% to 15% per year.

South Africa
In September 2010 the penetration rate was estimated at 99.6% over a population estimate of 49 million.

The telecom regulator in South Africa is Independent Communications Authority of South Africa (ICASA).

South Sudan
The country has 1 million subscribers in total, or an 8% penetration rate.

The telecom regulator in South Sudan is Ministry of Telecommunication and Postal Services (MOTPS).

Sudan
In September 2010 the penetration rate was estimated at 42.3% over a population estimate of 45 million.

The telecom regulator in Sudan is National Telecommunication Corporation (NTC).

Eswatini
In September 2010 the penetration rate was estimated at 49.55% over a population estimate of 1.37 million.

The telecom regulator in Swaziland is Swaziland Communications Commission (SCCom).

Syrian Arab Republic
In September 2010 the penetration rate was estimated at 46.6% over a population estimate of 22.5 million.

The telecom regulator in Syrian Arab Republic is Syrian Telecommunication Regulatory Authority (SyTRA).

Tanzania (United Republic of)
In March 2020 the penetration rate was estimated at 86%  over a population estimate of 51 million.

The telecom regulator in Tanzania is Tanzania Communications Regulatory Authority (TCRA).

Togo
In June 2014 the penetration rate was estimated at 60.7% over a population estimate of 7.2 million.

The telecom regulator in Togo is Autorité de Règlementation des secteurs de Postes et de Télécommunications (ART&P).

Tunisia
The country has 14.7 million subscribers in total, or about 125.6% penetration rate. (Q3 2017)

The telecom regulator in Tunisia is Instance Nationale des Télécommunications (INT).

Turkey

Turkey has 86.3 million subscribers in total, or a 101.9% penetration rate. (2021)

The telecom regulator in Turkey is Information and Communication Technologies Authority (BTK : Bilgi Teknolojileri ve Iletisim Kurumu).

Uganda
In September 2010 the penetration rate was estimated at 30.78% over a population estimate of 34.6 million.

The telecom regulator in Uganda is Uganda Communications Commission (UCC).

United Arab Emirates
In May 2020 the total number of active mobile subscriptions was 16.7 million.

The telecom regulator in United Arab Emirates is Telecommunications Regulatory Authority الهيئة العامة لتنظيم قطاع الاتصالات (TRA).

Yemen
In September 2010 the penetration rate was estimated at 38.4% over a population estimate of 24.1 million. Because of unreliable coverage of mobile services in certain areas, particularly in rural areas, it is common for Yemenis to utilize a phone with Dual SIM capability.

The telecom regulator in Yemen is the Public Telecommunication Corporation.

Zambia
In December 2011 the penetration rate was estimated at 62% over a population estimate of 13.9 million.

The telecom regulator in Zambia is Zambia Information & Communications Technology Authority (ZICTA).

Zimbabwe
In December 2011 the penetration rate was estimated at 74.7% to 9.037 million subscribers.

The telecom regulator in Zimbabwe is Postal and Telecommunications Regulatory Authority of Zimbabwe (POTRAZ).

See also
 List of mobile network operators worldwide
 List of mobile network operators of the Americas
 List of mobile network operators of The Caribbean
 List of mobile network operators of Europe
 List of mobile network operators of the Asia Pacific region
 List of telecommunications regulatory bodies
 Mobile country code

References

Africa-related lists
Middle East-related lists
Middle East and Africa
Telecommunications in Africa
Telecommunications in Asia
Telecommunications lists